Red Barn may refer to:

Events
Red Barn Murder, a notorious 1827 crime committed in England

Places
Red Barn Gallery, a photography exhibition space in Belfast, Northern Ireland
Red Barn (Okeechobee, Florida), a historic structure in the United States
Red Barn Observatory, a facility for observing celestial objects located in Georgia, United States
Red Barn (restaurant), a fast-food chain founded in the United States in 1961
Red Barn (RIT), a recreational facility at the Rochester Institute of Technology located in New York, United States
 A nickname for the original manufacturing plant of Boeing in Washington, United States, now part of the Museum of Flight

See also
Red Barnes